Cara Fi (Love Me) is a Welsh romantic comedy-drama series that first broadcast in November 2014 on S4C, and was later made available on the BBC iPlayer. The eight-part series was created by Sarah Dollard. In 2015 the show was nominated for the BAFTA Cymru awards for costume design and for original music.

Plot
When a sleepy seaside village in Wales runs out of women, the locals try to turn things around by advertising their single men on the side of milk cartons leaving the dairy. Each episode focuses on a new woman arriving in the village to be set up with a local man.

The milk scheme is the brainchild of pub landlady Nancy Hopkins (Christine Pritchard), whose chief goal is to find a wife for her son, Will (Iwan John), so he won't move away from Tretarw. Unbeknownst to Nancy, Will is gay.

The series kicks off as Nancy's daughter, newly-single Nina (Rhian Jones), moves back to the village with her own daughter Lee (Saran Morgan). Nancy is determined to reunite Nina with her high-school sweetheart, pub chef Vic Reed (Steffan Rhodri). Much to Nancy's irritation, Nina instead hits it off with the nerdy, earnest local doctor, Brian (Gareth Pierce).

Main cast
Christine Pritchard as Nancy Hopkins, pub landlady
Rhian Jones as Nina Hopkins, Nancy's daughter
Saran Morgan as Lee Rees-Hopkins, Nina's daughter
Iwan John as Will Hopkins, Nancy's son
Steffan Rhodri as Vic Reed, pub chef
Gareth Pierce as Brian Phelps, local GP
Gwydion Rhys as Dai Jones
Gaynor Morgan Rees as Betty Jones

Episode list

Series 1 (2014)

Production
Cara Fi is set in the fictional Pembrokeshire village of Tretarw, but the plight of the area - an increase in holiday homes and an exodus of young people - is a very real problem faced by villages in rural Wales. Series producer Laura Cotton, who grew up in the area, said that the subject matter of the show was very close to her heart. "I wanted to come back and make it here, where I'm from, and show what an amazing, beautiful place it is", she said. "We were very aware of what is happening to small towns and villages, like my home town of Trefin, where most of the houses are now owned by holidaymakers".

Filming on Cara Fi began near Cardiff in March 2014, with the location shoot moving to Little Haven in Pembrokeshire in April. The shoot took place in and around The Swan Inn, renamed Yr Angor for the show. The owner of The Swan Inn, Paul Morris, said that the Cara Fi cast and crew had been welcome visitors to Little Haven, bringing a boost to the local economy.

Steffan Rhodri, best known for roles in Gavin & Stacey and Harry Potter and the Deathly Hallows – Part 1, said the quality of the show's script is what attracted him to the part: "What's so often missing from Welsh comedy is a genuine wit, and this has it".

The Welsh language series, produced by Touchpaper Television, began screening on S4C in November 2014, with English subtitles, and subsequently became available on the BBC iPlayer.

References

External links
 

2014 British television series debuts
2014 British television series endings
2010s British romantic comedy television series
2010s Welsh television series
2010s British television miniseries
S4C original programming
Television shows set in the United Kingdom
Television series by Banijay